Josip Pokupec (20 August 1913 – 2 April 1999) was a Yugoslav cyclist. He competed in the individual and team road race events at the 1936 Summer Olympics.

References

External links
 

1913 births
1999 deaths
Yugoslav male cyclists
Olympic cyclists of Yugoslavia
Cyclists at the 1936 Summer Olympics
Place of birth missing